= Diamondère =

E-commerce company

- Company type: Private
- Industry: Retail, jewelry
- Founded: 2012
- Key people: Anish Godha (President); Varun Godha (CEO)
- Website: www.diamondere.com

Diamondère is a custom fine jewelry e-commerce company that was launched in February 2012. The founders are part of a family business which has designed jewelry for royal families and celebrities since 1890.

== History ==
In February 2012, Diamondère was founded by Anish Godha who graduated from Stanford University, and Varun Godha who graduated from Cornell University. The cousins focused on custom fine jewelry by using Computer-aided design (CAD) and 3D printing.

In 2015, Diamondère partnered with Sophie Tweed-Simmons, daughter of Gene Simmons, to create a fine jewelry collection.

In April 2015, Diamondère supported the people affected by the Nepal earthquake by donating one day's worth of sales to the victims.

== Operations ==
The e-commerce company creates custom jewelry. Customers work with design consultants to create a CAD 3D model based on a picture, drawing or an existing design. Once the image is approved, a wax mold is created with 3D printing. The mold goes through a foundry process to cast the jewelry design. The jewelry is then set with the specified gemstones ranging from high quality diamonds to colored stones such as sapphires, rubies, or emeralds. Customers can also change and choose the gemstones and metal directly from the Diamondère website.

Diamondère is certified Solitaire Gemological Laboratories.
